Zhang Guoguang (born April 1945) was the former governor of Liaoning Province, serving in 1998–2001, as well as the former governor of Hubei Province, serving in 2001–2002. He was born in Suizhong in 1945.

External links 
Zhang Guoguang Career

1945 births
Living people
Governors of Liaoning
Governors of Hubei
People from Huludao
Beihang University alumni
Expelled members of the Chinese Communist Party